The Women's sprint was held on 22 and 23 October 2016.

Results

Qualifying
The top 12 qualify for the match rounds.

1/8 Finals
Winners proceed directly to the quarter-finals; losers proceed to the repechage.

1/8 Finals Repechage
Winners proceed to the quarter-finals; losers proceed to the race for places 9-12.

Race for 9th place
This ranking final determines the allocation of places 9-12.

Quarter-finals
One-on-one matches are extended to a 'best of three' format hereon.
Winners proceed to the semi-finals; losers proceed to the race for places 5-8.

Race for 5th place
This ranking final determines the allocation of places 5-8.

Semi-finals
Winners proceed to the gold medal final; losers proceed to the bronze medal final.

Finals
The final classification is determined in the medal finals.

References

Women's sprint
European Track Championships – Women's sprint